This is a round-up of the 1978 Sligo Senior Football Championship. Tourlestrane won their first title in 22 years, after defeating surprise finalists Grange, who had caused a major upset by knocking out the holders and reigning Connacht champions, St. Mary's, in the semi-final after a replay. This final remains not only Grange's only appearance in a Senior final, but the only occasion that a team from North Sligo has reached the final. The Championship structure was changed in this year, from the two-section round-robin method, to a knockout system, where the sides defeated in the opening round played on in their own section, with two sides qualifying for the semi-finals, while two sides from the "winner's section" joined them in the last four. This was the only year that such a backdoor system operated in the Championship.

At the end of the year a more significant structure change took place - the Intermediate grade was introduced for 1979, with the sixteen teams divided in two by league position - the top eight remaining in Senior, the rest demoted to the new grade, and one went to Junior with the Junior champions taking their place in Intermediate. The result was that the 1978 finalists Grange, found themselves relegated along with semi-finalists Shamrock Gaels. Other sides who had made an impact in the previous decade, including Easkey, Mullinabreena and Owenmore Gaels, also made the drop, with the latter being the only one of the eight not to return to Senior level since.

First round

Second round

Quarter finals

Semi-finals

Sligo Senior Football Championship Final

References

 Sligo Champion (Summer-Autumn 1978)

Sligo Senior Football Championship
Sligo